Southern Reunion (Angel Air SJPCD163) is Mo Foster's second solo album.

All tracks were produced by Mo, engineered and mixed by Simon Smart, with the exception of "The Man From The Everglades" which was engineered and mixed by Mo.

Southern Reunion was originally released on the MMC label in 1991 and was subsequently remastered and re-released in 2004 on the Angel Air record label.

Track listing 
 "Gil" – 5:22
 "Blue" – 5:25
 "Achill Island" – 6:48
 "Waves" – 5:17
 "Tricotism" – 4:06
 "A Notional Anthem" – 5:28
 "Southern Reunion" – 4:29
 "Grand Unified Boogie" – 3:57
 "Fractal Landscape" – 4:24
 "Shin-Kan-Sen" – 6:09
 "The Man From The Everglades" – 4:05 (bonus track only on 2004 reissue)

All tracks were written by Mo Foster with the exception of "Tricotism" which was written by Oscar Pettiford.

Personnel
 Mo Foster - Basses, keyboards
 Gary Husband - drums, keyboards
 Gary Moore - Guitar
 Ray Warleigh - Flute, Alto Flute, Piccolo
 Iain Ballamy - Soprano saxophone
 Stan Sulzman - Soprano saxophone
 Ray Russell - Guitar
 Frank Ricotti - Vibraphone, percussion
 Stuart Brookes - Trumpet
 Greg Knowles - percussion
 Geoff Castle - keyboards
 Julian Littman - Mandolin
 Snail's-Pace Slim - Slide Guitar
 Karen Bates - Voice

Technical details
It was recorded between June and July 1988 and September 1990 at Last Chance Recordings, London, England
with additional recordings being made at Woodcray Manor Studios, Berkshire, England and Northpond Studio, London, England.

The 2004 re-release was digitally remastered from the original analogue masters by Simon Smart at Blue Base Studio, London, England

1991 albums
Mo Foster albums
Angel Air albums